The 2021–22 Serbian First League is the 17th season of the Serbian First League since its establishment.

League format
The league consist of 16 teams: eight teams from the 2020–21 Serbian First League, six teams relegated from 2020–21 Serbian SuperLiga and two new teams promoted from Serbian League.

Teams

Regular season

League table

Results

Play-offs

Promotion round
The top eight teams advanced from the regular season. Teams played each other once.

League table

Results

Relegation round
The bottom eight teams from the regular season play in the relegation round. Teams play each other once.

League table

Results

Individual statistics

Top goalscorers
As of matches played on 22 May 2022.

Hat-tricks

4 Player scored four goals

References

External links
 Official website
 srbijasport.net

Serbian First League seasons
2021–22 in Serbian football leagues
Serbia